William Frederick Denning (25 November 1848 – 9 June 1931) was a British amateur astronomer who achieved considerable success without formal scientific training. He is known for his catalogues of meteor radiants, observations of Jupiter's red spot, and for the discovery of five comets. Outside astronomy, as a young man, Denning showed prowess at cricket to the extent W G Grace invited him to play for Gloucestershire. However Denning’s retiring nature made him decline the offer.

Career
Denning devoted a great deal of time to searching for comets, and discovered five of them, including the periodic comet 72P/Denning–Fujikawa and the lost comet D/1894 F1. The latter was the last comet discovered on British soil until the discoveries of George Alcock.

Denning also studied meteors and novae, discovering Nova Cygni 1920 (V476 Cyg). From 1869 Denning held the combined post of secretary and treasurer of the short-lived Observing Astronomical Society. Denning was elected to the Royal Astronomical Society on 8 June 1877. He was also elected to the British Astronomical Association on 26 October 1898. Subsequently directed its Comet (1891–1893) and Meteor (1899–1900) Sections. He won the Prix Valz of the French Academy of Sciences for 1895.

During his life, Denning published 1179 articles in prominent scientific journals including Nature, The Observatory, Astronomische Nachrichten, Journal of the Royal Astronomical Society of Canada, Journal des Observateurs, and Monthly Notices of the Royal Astronomical Society.

Awards and honors
 In 1898, Denning won the Gold Medal of the Royal Astronomical Society.
 He also won the Donohoe Comet Medal for his July 23, 1890 discovery of a comet.
Such was his standing in the astronomical community that following his death a memorial tablet was fixed to his house.
 Crater Denning on the Moon as well as the Martian crater Denning were named after him in 1970 and 1973, respectively.
 Asteroid 71885 Denning, discovered by the Spacewatch program in 2000, was named in his memory. The official  was published by the Minor Planet Center on 4 October 2009.

References
 

 Phil Williams (July 2015) "William Frederick Denning F.R.A.S."  Liverpool Astronomical Society Newsletter (July 2015, pp,4–6)

External links
 
 Telescopic work for starlight evenings Cornell University Library Historical Monographs Collection.
 W. F. Denning – The Doyen of Amateur Astronomers Short biography by Martin Beech, Campion College, The University of Regina, Canada

1848 births
1931 deaths
19th-century British astronomers
Recipients of the Gold Medal of the Royal Astronomical Society
20th-century British astronomers